The Forch railway (FB, Frieda ) is a local railway line in the Swiss canton of Zürich. It is owned and operated by the Forchbahn AG, and is branded as line S18 of the Zürich S-Bahn. The standard Zürcher Verkehrsverbund (ZVV) zonal fare tariffs apply to the line.

The line opened in 1912 and links the towns of Esslingen and Forch to Rehalp, an outer suburb of the city of Zürich.

The line is built to metre gauge ( gauge).

History 
The Forch railway line opened on November 27, 1912, with the trip taking 67 minutes. As built, the line from the Zürich city boundary to Esslingen was a single track tramway, largely mixed in with road traffic. At Esslingen, the Forch line connected with the Uster-Oetwil line and, indirectly via that, with the Wetzikon-Meilen line. These two metre gauge tramway lines had both closed by 1950.

In 1950 it was proposed that the line should be replaced by buses, and a two-week test bus operation was undertaken with moderate success. The conclusion of the experiment was that retaining the line was the best solution provided that the line could be separated from the street and modernized. In the following decade, separation of rail and road traffic was increased. New bogie rolling stock was acquired, similar to two cars built for the line in the late 1940s.

In 1970, a new depot and station was built at Forch, together with a new section of line and underpass under the new main road. Between 1973 and 1976 a tunnel was built under the village of Zumikon, eliminating the street section through that village. In 1976, new Tram 2000 trains were introduced and a regular 15-minute train frequency was introduced. By 1979 the line had been doubled as far as Neue Forch.

Projected extensions to Zürich Hauptbahnhof and Wetzikon were under consideration as early as 1979, but have yet to become reality. In 1990, the line was added to the ZVV transportation network, and in 1995 a new terminus was built at Esslingen. In 2004, new low floor cars were acquired from Stadler to replace the 1950s stock. In 2007, the terminus at Stadelhofen was realigned.

Operation

Route 
The Forchbahn platforms are flanked by platforms for tram routes 11 and 8 of the Zürich tram system, which share tracks with the initial stretch of the Forchbahn.

Between Stadelhofen and Rehalp, the Forchbahn trains use the tracks of the tram system, owned by the Verkehrsbetriebe Zürich (VBZ), which are electrified at 600 V DC and are largely situated in the street. Between these two points, Forchbahn trains serve intermediate tram stops at Kreuzplatz (where tram route 8 diverges), Hegibachplatz and Balgrist.

At Rehalp tram route 11 has its terminus, and the Forchbahn trains enter the line's separate Rehalp station. Here they join the Forchbahn proper, which is electrified on the overhead system at 1200 V DC. From Rehalp to the Waltikon station the line uses a roadside double track alignment, and serves the intermediate  stations of Waldburg, Spital Zollikerberg and Zollikerberg.

Immediately after leaving Waltikon station, the line enters a double track tunnel under the village of Zumikon, serving the underground stations of Zumikon and Maiacher. The line surfaces just before entering Neue Forch station, where it resumes its roadside alignment. The next section of line, between Neue Forch and Forch, is single track, to be double tracked in the 2020s. The line's headquarters is situated at the 1970s Forch station, which includes a depot complex.

After Forch the line passes under the motor way built 1970 before returning to its alignment alongside the old road. The remainder of the line is single track, and serves intermediate stations at Scheuren, Neuhaus bei Hinteregg, Hinteregg, Egg, Langwies and Emmat. All these stops include passing loops, with the exception of Langwies and Emmat. The line terminates at the modern Esslingen station, which has three tracks and an overall roof.

Services 
 

The passenger services on the line forms part of the Zürich S-Bahn, branded as the S18. The standard Zürcher Verkehrsverbund (ZVV) zonal fare tariffs apply to the line.

During the day, trains calling at all stops run every 15 minutes from Stadelhofen to Forch, with every second train continuing to Esslingen. At peak periods, four express trains per hour run to Esslingen without stopping between Rehalp and Forch, whilst another four trains per hour provide a stopping service as far as Forch. Stopping trains take about 35 minutes to cover the full journey, with express trains some 5 minutes faster.

Rolling stock 
The line uses the following rolling stock:

Trailer car, B 119 originally built 1930 for Lausanne Tramways, was preserved in the Zürich Tram Museum from 2007 until 2021. 
 
After the 1950/60 stock was rendered surplus by the new Stadler cars, the Forchbahn motor cars BDe 4/4 11 to 16, and driving trailers Bt 101 to  108 (less the scrapped Bt 107) were donated to the municipality of Antananarivo in Madagascar. The vehicles were shipped to Madagascar in 2004/5, for use in creating a suburban train service, but by 2021 they were still in store there.
In 2021, according to a news item in the madegassian paper  «La Vérité», using the trailer cars for a jungle express in the south east of the island was proposed.

References

External links 
 
 Official website 
 ZVV official website: zone map 

Metre gauge railways in Switzerland
Railway lines in Switzerland
Transport in the canton of Zürich
Transport in Zürich
Zürich S-Bahn lines